Jérémy Michalak (born 28 October 1980) is a French television presenter and producer.  He is known for presenting the sketch comedy show On n'demande qu'à en rire after he took over from Laurent Ruquier in 2012.

Biography
Jérémy Michalak was born on October 28, 1980 in Saint-Maur-des-Fossés in the Val-de-Marne.

Career

Radio career
On March 27, 2015, he made his first appearance on Laurent Ruquier's program Les Grosses Têtes on RTL.

At the start of the 2016 school year, he was announced as a columnist on Alessandra Sublet's new show, broadcast from 3:30 p.m. to 5 p.m. on Europe 1.

TV career
From 2001 to 2002, he played a role in Le Groupe, a series by Jean-Luc Azoulay and Bénédicte Laplace.

In 2010, he became editor-in-chief of the TV version of On va s'gêner, every month on France 4.

From September 2009 to June 2014, during the first five seasons of the show, he was a columnist in the daily C à vous between 7 p.m. and 8 p.m. on France 5.

From September 3, 2012 to June 28, 2013, he hosted On n'demande qu'à en rire on France 2, replacing Laurent Ruquier.

References

External links
 

1980 births
French television presenters
French television producers
French people of Polish descent
Living people
People from Saint-Maur-des-Fossés